Krokhovo is a rural locality (a village) in Savinskoye Rural Settlement, Permsky District, Perm Krai, Russia. The population was 393 as of 2010. There are 5 streets.

Geography 
Krokhovo is located 19 km southwest of Perm (the district's administrative centre) by road. Bolshoye Savino is the nearest rural locality.

References 

Rural localities in Permsky District